Two Japanese warships have borne the name Manazuru:

 , a  launched in 1899 and stricken in 1921
 , a  launched in 1933 and sunk in 1945

Imperial Japanese Navy ship names
Japanese Navy ship names